The uranium market, like all commodity markets, has a history of volatility, moving with the standard forces of supply and demand as well as geopolitical pressures. It has also evolved particularities of its own in response to the unique nature and use of uranium.

Historically, uranium has been mined in countries willing to export, including Australia and Canada. However, countries now responsible for more than 50% of the world’s uranium production include Kazakhstan, Namibia, Niger, and Uzbekistan.

Uranium from mining is used almost entirely as fuel for nuclear power plants. Following the 2011 Fukushima nuclear disaster, the global uranium market remains depressed, with the uranium price falling more than 50%, declining share values, and reduced profitability of uranium producers since March 2011. As a result, uranium companies worldwide have reduced capacity, closed operations and deferred new production.

Before uranium is ready for use as nuclear fuel in reactors, it must undergo a number of intermediary processing steps that are identified as the front end of the nuclear fuel cycle: mining it (either by ISL or by mining and milling into yellowcake); enriching it; and finally fuel fabrication to produce fuel assemblies or bundles.

History

The world's top uranium producers in 2017, representing 71% of total production, were Kazakhstan (39% of world production), Canada (22%) and Australia (10%). Other major producers included Niger, Namibia and Russia. Initial treatment facilities to produce uranium oxide are almost always located at the mining sites. The facilities for enrichment, on the other hand, are found in those countries that produce significant amounts of electricity from nuclear power. Large commercial enrichment plants are in operation in France, Germany, Netherlands, UK, United States, and Russia, with smaller plants elsewhere.

Global demand for uranium rose steadily from the end of World War II, largely driven by nuclear weapons procurement programs. This trend lasted until the early 1980s, when changing geopolitical circumstances as well as environmental, safety, and economic concerns over nuclear power plants reduced demand somewhat. The production of a series of large hydro-electric power stations has also helped to depress the global market since the early 1970s. This phenomenon can be traced back to the construction of the vast Aswan Dam in Egypt. During this time, large uranium inventories accumulated. Until 1985 the Western uranium industry was producing material much faster than nuclear power plants and military programs were consuming it. Uranium prices slid throughout the decade, leaving the price below $10 per pound for yellowcake by year-end 1989.
 
As uranium prices fell, producers began curtailing operations or exiting the business entirely, leaving only a few actively involved in uranium mining and causing uranium inventories to shrink significantly. Since 1990 uranium requirements have outstripped uranium production.

Several factors are pushing both industrialized and developing nations to seek alternatives to fossil fuels. The increasing rate of consumption of fossil fuel is a concern for nations lacking in reserves, especially non-OPEC nations, as is the pollution produced by coal-burning plants. On the other hand, it is still difficult to tap economically into the world's vast solar, wind, and tidal energy reserves. Uranium suppliers hope that these factors will drive an increase in uranium production due to demand for nuclear power generation.

Uranium prices reached an all-time low of US$7/lb in 2001. This low was followed by a period of gradual rise, followed by a bubble culminating in mid-2007, with the price to peaking at around US$137/lb, the highest price (adjusted for inflation) in 25 years. The higher price during the bubble has spurred new prospecting and reopening of old mines. In 2012 Kazatomprom and Areva were the top two producing companies (with 15% of the production each), followed by Cameco (14%), ARMZ Uranium Holding (13%) and Rio Tinto (9%).

Because of the improvements in gas centrifuge technology in the 2000s, replacing former gaseous diffusion plants, cheaper separative work units have enabled the economic production of more enriched uranium from a given amount of natural uranium, by re-enriching tails ultimately leaving a depleted uranium tail of lower enrichment. This has somewhat lowered the demand for natural uranium.

Market operations
Unlike other metals such as copper or nickel, uranium is not traded on an organized commodity exchange such as the London Metal Exchange. Instead it is traded in most cases through contracts negotiated directly between a buyer and a seller.  Recently, however, the New York Mercantile Exchange announced a 10-year agreement to provide for the trade of on and off exchange uranium futures contracts.

The structure of uranium supply contracts varies widely. Pricing can be as simple as a single fixed price, or based on various reference prices with economic corrections built in. Contracts traditionally specify a base price, such as the uranium spot price, and rules for escalation. In base-escalated contracts, the buyer and seller agree on a base price that escalates over time on the basis of an agreed-upon formula, which may take economic indices, such as GDP or inflation factors, into consideration.

A spot market contract usually consists of just one delivery and is typically priced at or near the published spot market price at the time of purchase. However 85% of all uranium has been sold under long-term, multi-year contracts with deliveries starting one to three years after the contract is made. Long-term contract terms range from two to 10 years, but typically run three to five years, with the first delivery occurring within 24 months of contract award. They may also include a clause that allows the buyer to vary the size of each delivery within prescribed limits. For example, delivery quantities may vary from the prescribed annual volume by plus or minus 15%.

One of the peculiarities of the nuclear fuel cycle is the way in which utilities with nuclear power plants buy their fuel. Instead of buying fuel bundles from the fabricator, the usual approach is to purchase uranium in all of these intermediate forms. Typically, a fuel buyer from power utilities will contract separately with suppliers at each step of the process. Sometimes, the fuel buyer may purchase enriched uranium product, the end product of the first three stages, and contract separately for fabrication, the fourth step to eventually obtain the fuel in a form that can be loaded into the reactor. The utilities believe—rightly or wrongly—that these options offers them the best price and service. They will typically retain two or three suppliers for each stage of the fuel cycle, who compete for their business by tender. Sellers consist of suppliers in each of the four stages as well as brokers and traders. There are fewer than 100 companies that buy and sell uranium in the western world.

In addition to being sold in different forms, uranium markets are differentiated by geography. The global trading of uranium has evolved into two distinct marketplaces shaped by historical and political forces. The first, the western world marketplace comprises the Americas, Western Europe and Australia. A separate marketplace comprises countries within the former Soviet Union, or the Commonwealth of Independent States (CIS), Eastern Europe and China. Most of the fuel requirements for nuclear power plants in the CIS are supplied from the CIS's own stockpiles. Often producers within the CIS also supply uranium and fuel products to the western world, increasing competition.

Available supply

As of 2015, total identified uranium resources were sufficient for more than a century of supply based on current requirements.

In 1983, physicist Bernard Cohen proposed that the world supply of uranium is effectively inexhaustible, and could therefore be considered a form of renewable energy.  He noted that fast breeder reactors, fueled by naturally-replenished uranium extracted from seawater, could supply energy at least as long as the sun's expected remaining lifespan of five billion years.  These reactors would use uranium-238, which is more abundant than the uranium-235 required by conventional reactors.

See also
List of countries by uranium production
List of countries by uranium reserves
Uranium mining
List of uranium mines
Used nuclear fuel
Reprocessed uranium
Special nuclear material
Megatons to Megawatts Program
Uranium bubble of 2007
Uranium Participation Corporation
 Depression glass
 Uranium tile
 Peak uranium

References

External links
 Uranium 101: Markets
Uranium prices from UxC
Uranium prices from TradeTech

Uranium
Nuclear materials
Commodity markets
Wholesale markets